Dar Balut may refer to:
Cham-e Dar Balut, Ilam Province
Dar Balut, Qasr-e Shirin, Kermanshah Province
Dar Balut, Sarpol-e Zahab, Kermanshah Province
Dar Balut-e Olya, Lorestan Province
Dar Balut-e Sofla, Lorestan Province